The 2008 NCAA Division I Football Championship Game was a postseason college football game between the Richmond Spiders and the Montana Grizzlies. It was played on December 19, 2008, at Finley Stadium, home field of the University of Tennessee at Chattanooga. The culminating game of the 2008 NCAA Division I FCS football season, it was won by Richmond, 24–7.

Teams
The participants of the Championship Game were the finalists of the 2008 FCS Playoffs, which began with a 16-team bracket.

Richmond Spiders

Richmond finished their regular season with a 9–3 record (6–2 in conference), after starting their season 4–3 through their first seven games. The Spiders defeated Eastern Kentucky, second-seeded Appalachian State, and third-seeded Northern Iowa to reach the final. This was Richmond's first appearance in an FCS/Division I-AA championship game.

Montana Grizzlies

Montana finished their regular season with an 11–1 record (7–1 in conference). As the fourth-seed in the tournament, the Grizzlies defeated Texas State, Weber State (who had given Montana their only defeat during the regular season), and top-seeded James Madison to reach the final. This was Montana's sixth appearance in an FCS/Division I-AA championship game, having previously won in 1995 and 2001, and having lost in 1996, 2000, and 2004.

Game summary

Scoring summary

Game statistics

References

Further reading

External links
 Box score at ESPN

Championship Game
NCAA Division I Football Championship Games
Montana Grizzlies football games
Richmond Spiders football games
College football in Tennessee
American football competitions in Chattanooga, Tennessee
NCAA Division I Football Championship Game
NCAA Division I Football Championship Game